Tobias Breitschädel is an Austrian mountain bike orienteering competitor. At the 2011 World MTB Orienteering Championships in Vicenza, he won a bronze medal in the middle distance, behind Samuli Saarela from Finland and Ruslan Gritsan from Russia.

References

External links
 
 Tobias Breitschädel at World of O Runners

Austrian orienteers
Male orienteers
Austrian male cyclists
Mountain bike orienteers
Living people
Year of birth missing (living people)